Bishnupaduka (also Vishnupaduka) is one of the holy places for Hindus. It is situated in the northwest part of Dharan, where the holy river Kokaha originated. Local people found a rock with two clear footprints and it is believed that the footprints are of Lord Vishnu. So the people built a small temple and called it Bishnupaduka temple.

This religious place is mentioned on the one hundred and tenth chapter of the Holy book Brahma Purana. It clearly states that Lord Vishnu and Laxmi observed Sharaddha (holy rituals remembering the departed ancestors) of Arsha and other Divine Ancestors. Every year many Hindus from the surrounding area gather here, specially during the month of Paush for the Shraddha of their ancestors.

The main pilgrimage sites to perform shraddha are Gokarna of Kathmandu, Betrawati of Rasuwa, and Bishnupaduka of Dharan.

Spritures have accepted this shrine to be older and holier than Gaya of India.

References

Hindu temples in Nepal
[[Category:Hindu temples in the Province No. 1
Buildings and structures in Sunsari District